= Convento de las Concepcionistas, Toledo =

Convent in Castile-La Mancha, Spain

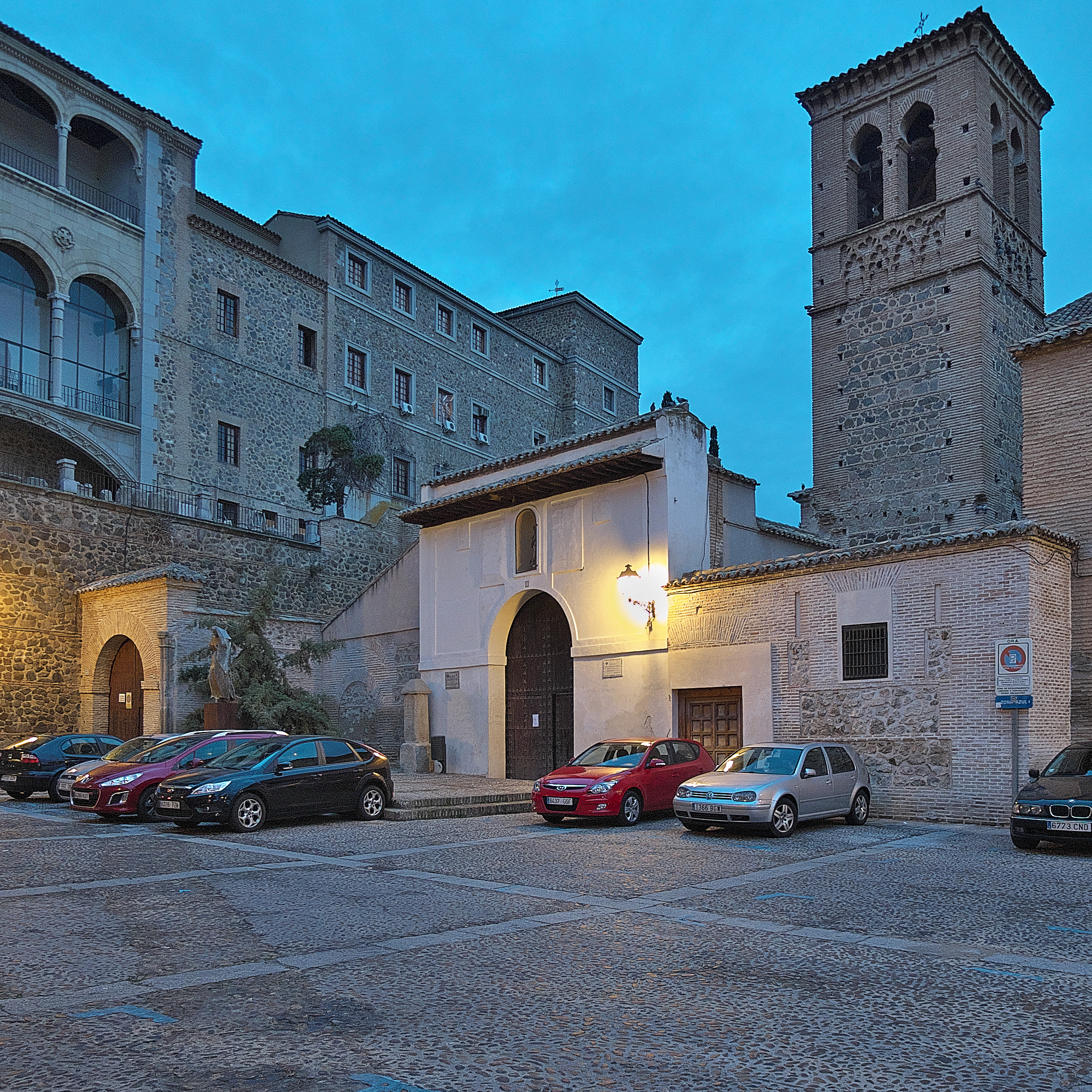
Convento de las Concepcionistas

The Convento de las Concepcionistas is a convent located in Toledo, in Castile-La Mancha, Spain. It was founded in 1484 by Doña Beatriz de Silva.

With the arrival of the Conceptionists, the convent was transformed enormously. The church was reformed, the high cloister was constructed and the place took Renaissance dyes that were united to the Gothic ones.

The creation of a space accessible from the street, has allowed the creation of a visitable space that, without interfering in the private space of convent life, allows a route from the subsoil to the exterior of the convent, passing in the interior by an enabled space that flows into an old courtyard at the foot of the Mudéjar tower, which has been covered with a flat glass roof.

From here begins a tour that culminates in a spectacular vaulted crypt, whose original use seems to be to serve as a pantheon, judging by the set of tombs of superimposed lucillos, mode of burial of the Mudéjar era, characterized by brick tombs closed with a brick also covered.
